JSC Meteor Plant is a Russian-based producer of Frequency Control Products, (quartz crystals, quartz oscillators and high-reliable piezoelectric filters).

History 
Meteor was officially founded on 17 July 1959 in Volzhsky city (Volgograd region).
It pioneered producing quartz crystals HC-27/U (рус. КБ) and HC-29/U (рус. КА) – in USSR.
By the end of the 1980s Meteor was considered as one of the leading quartz crystal manufacturer in the Soviet Union.  The number of employees reached 5500 in 1989. Meteor was restructured as a joint stock company in 1993.

Market 

Nowadays the company exports its production to nearly 500 enterprises from Russia and CIS (Commonwealth of Independent States). Meteor's production has industrial and satellite purpose. Its product range include quartz crystals for temperature compensated crystal oscillators (TCXO), for oven controlled crystal oscillators (OCXO), quartz crystals of general application for wide temperature range, quartz crystals of general application with heightened resistance to mechanical exposure.

The plant's quality system is certificated in accordance with certification system ISO 9001.
JSC Meteor also has licenses by Russian Control systems federal agency on designing and manufacturing defence technologies.
"Meteor" considered itself as a time-tested supplier for Russian radio electronic plants.

External links
 Official website

Electronics companies of Russia
Ruselectronics
Companies based in Volgograd Oblast
Electronics companies of the Soviet Union
Russian brands
1959 establishments in the Soviet Union